
Aerotécnica was a Spanish aircraft manufacturer established in Madrid in 1954 to develop Jean Cantinieau's helicopter designs. After manufacturing small numbers of the AC-12 and AC-14, the firm ceased trading in 1962, as a consequence of lower cost for Spanish Air Force of US Helicopters, surplus of Korea War.

Aircraft
 Aerotécnica AC-11 
 Aerotécnica AC-12 
 Aerotécnica AC-13 
 Aerotécnica AC-14
 Aerotécnica AC-15 
 Aerotécnica AC-21

References

Defunct aircraft manufacturers of Spain
Manufacturing companies based in Madrid